The Ilariidae is a family of fossil mammals. Most ilariids are found in the middle Tertiary faunal assemblages of South Australia. Ilaria illumidens is the best-preserved representative of this extinct clade of vombatiforms. 

The species is found in the Namba Formation of Late Oligocene age, at Lake Pinpa, South Australia. The material consists of a partial cranium and mandibular fragments with most of the dentition, together with parts of the postcranial skeleton. The other species in this family are known from a few jaw fragments and intact molars attached; they are categorised in a separate family because their teeth structure is unique among Diprotodontia, in having a complicated folding pattern. Ilariids are thought to be the largest marsupials of their time in the Lake Eyre and Tarkarooloo basin.

References
Patricia Vickers-Rich and Thomas Hewett Rich 1993 Wildlife of Gondwana Reed Books, Chatswood, New South Wales  Reed.

Prehistoric mammal families
Prehistoric vombatiforms
Prehistoric vertebrates of Oceania
Chattian first appearances
Miocene extinctions